Maurice Henry (born March 12, 1967) is a former American football linebacker. He played for the Philadelphia Eagles in 1990 and for the Ottawa Rough Riders from 1993 to 1994.

References

1967 births
Living people
American football linebackers
Kansas State Wildcats football players
Philadelphia Eagles players
Ottawa Rough Riders players